De Camp is an extinct town in eastern Phelps County, in the U.S. state of Missouri. The community was located on the Elliott Branch of Norman Creek, approximately three-quarters of one mile east of Missouri Route F and about six miles south of St. James.

A post office called Decamp was established in 1905, and remained in operation until 1926. The community took its name from a nearby mine of the same name.

References

Ghost towns in Missouri
Former populated places in Phelps County, Missouri